Brahmavihara-Arama also known as Vihara Buddha Banjar because of its location in the Banjar District of Buleleng is a buddhist Temple Monastery in the mountains near Lovina in North Bali.

Due to its location within Bali—a predominantly Hindu Island in Indonesia—this temple has a lot of Hindu influences in the statues in architecture.

References

Buddhist temples in Indonesia
Religious buildings and structures completed in 1969
20th-century Buddhist temples